The second competition weekend of the 2011–12 ISU Speed Skating World Cup was held in the Alau Ice Palace in Astana, Kazakhstan, from Friday, 25 November, until Sunday, 27 November 2011.

Schedule of events
The schedule of the event is below:

Medal summary

Men's events

Women's events

References

2
Isu World Cup, 2011-12, 2
Sport in Astana